Gareth Maybin (born 14 September 1980) is a Northern Irish professional golfer.

Career
Born in Belfast, Maybin turned professional in 2005 after completing a scholarship at the University of South Alabama. He remained in the United States and competed on the NGA Hooters Tour, where he finished fourth on the money list in his first season. He won two events on the tour between 2005 and 2007, and had several other top ten finishes.

In 2007, Maybin began to receive invitations to Challenge Tour tournaments in Europe, and after a series of strong finishes took up membership of this tour. The following year, he won the Qingdao Golf Open on his way to fourth place on the Challenge Tour money list, which gave him full exemption on the European Tour for 2009.

In his third event on the European Tour, Maybin lost in a playoff at the 2008 South African Open. This runner-up finish elevated him into the top 100 of the Official World Golf Rankings for the first time. Maybin finished the 2010 season in the top 40 on the Race to Dubai.

Maybin represented Ireland, alongside Michael Hoey at the 2007 Omega Mission Hills World Cup where they finished in 24th position.

Maybin announced his retirement from professional golf in 2017. He is now a full-time teaching professional at Galgorm Castle Golf Club.

Professional wins (3)

Challenge Tour wins (1)

NGA Hooters Tour wins (2)
2005 The Base Camp Realty-Chesdin Landing Open
2006 The Quicksilver Classic

Playoff record
European Tour playoff record (0–1)

Results in major championships

CUT = missed the half-way cut
"T" = tied
Note: Maybin never played in the Masters Tournament or the PGA Championship.

Team appearances
Amateur
Palmer Cup (representing Europe): 2004 (winners)
European Amateur Team Championship (representing Ireland): 2005

Professional
World Cup (representing Ireland): 2007

See also
2008 Challenge Tour graduates

References

External links

Gareth Maybin at the NGA Hooters Tour official site

Male golfers from Northern Ireland
European Tour golfers
People educated at Larne Grammar School
1980 births
Living people